Jack Higginson (21 June 1891 – 15 October 1966) was a British athlete. He competed in the men's triple jump at the 1924 Summer Olympics.

References

External links
 

1891 births
1966 deaths
Athletes (track and field) at the 1924 Summer Olympics
British male triple jumpers
Olympic athletes of Great Britain
Place of birth missing